FOCS is an abbreviation for the annual IEEE Symposium on Foundations of Computer Science. 

It may also refer to:

Federation of Old Cornwall Societies
Fiber optic current sensor
FOCS, a flight scheduling product from Flygprestanda
Friends of Clayoquot Sound

See also

FOC (disambiguation), some of whose expansions may be pluralized as FOCs